The 7th AVN Awards ceremony, organized by Adult Video News (AVN), took place on January 8, 1990, at the Tropicana Hotel & Casino in Paradise, Nevada. During the ceremony, AVN Awards were presented in 44 categories honoring pornographic films released the previous year. Actor Rick Savage hosted the show with segment co-hosts Christy Canyon, Barbara Dare and Nina Hartley. Portions of the show were taped for a segment on Entertainment Tonight.

The Nicole Stanton Story won five awards, the most of any feature, however Best Film went to Night Trips, which took three trophies, as did Voodoo Lust. Two awards went to each of Bi and Beyond III, True Love and Undercover.

Winners and nominees

The winners were announced during the awards ceremony on January 8, 1990. The first AVN Awards tie occurred as Victoria Paris and Tori Welles were named co-winners of the Best New Starlet category. Jon Martin won Best Actor for the second consecutive year.

 Best Actor: Jon Martin, Cool Sheets
 Best Actor—Gay Video: Tim Lowe, Fratrimony
 Best Actress: Sharon Kane, Bodies in Heat—The Sequel
 Best All-Girl Feature: Where The Boys Aren't
 Best All-Girl Sex Scene: Barbara Dare, April West; True Love
 Best All-Sex Feature: Hello Molly
 Best Amateur Tape: Bus Stop Tales, Vol. 1
 Best Anal-Themed Feature: Splendor In The Ass
 Best Art Direction—Film or Video: Voodoo Lust
 Best Bisexual Video: Bi and Beyond III
 Best Box Cover Concept: Rain Woman, Coast to Coast Video
 Best Box Cover Concept—Gay Video: Buddy System II
 Best Cinematography: Andrew Blake, Night Trips
 Best Compilation Tape: Only The Best 2
 Best Director—Bisexual Video: Paul Norman, Bi and Beyond III
 Best Director—Feature Film: Henri Pachard, The Nicole Stanton Story I & II
 Best Director—Gay Video: John Travis, Undercover
 Best Director—Shot-on-Video Feature: Jean-Pierre Ferrand, Peter Davy; Voodoo Lust
 Best Editing—Film: The Nicole Stanton Story
 Best Editing—Video: Andrew Blake, Night Trips 
 Best Gay Video Feature: Undercover
 Best Music: My Bare Lady
 Best Newcomer—Gay Video: Brian Yeager, Buddy System
 Best New Starlet: Victoria Paris, Tori Welles (tie)
 Best Non-Sex Role: Nick Random, True Love
 Best Overall Marketing Campaign: Australian Erotica, Parliament Video
 Best Packaging: twentysomething, Episode 3; Vivid Video
 Best Packaging—Gay Video: Davey and the Cruisers
 Best Picture: Night Trips
 Best Screenplay—Feature Film: Rick Marx, The Nicole Stanton Story
 Best Screenplay—Video Feature: Jace Rocker; Cheeks 2: The Bitter End
 Best Sex Scene—Feature Film: Eric Edwards, Sharon Kane; Firestorm 3
 Best Sex Scene—Gay Video: Lon Flexxe, Bill Marlowe; Heat in the Night
 Best Sex Scene—Group: Marc Wallice, Blake Palmer, Randy West, Jesse Eastern, Debi Diamond; Gang Bangs II
 Best Sex Scene—Video Feature: Tom Byron, Debi Diamond; The Chameleon
 Best Shot-on-Video Feature: Mad Love
 Best Softcore Release: Party Favors
 Best Specialty Tape: Wild Thing
 Best Supporting Actor (Film & Video): Rick Savage, The Erotic Adventures of Bedman & Throbbin
 Best Supporting Actress (Film & Video): Viper, Mystery of the Golden Lotus
 Best Tease Performance: Tracey Adams, The Adventures of Buttman
 Best Videography: Voodoo Lust
 Top Renting Release of the Year: The Nicole Stanton Story
 Top Selling Release of the Year: The Nicole Stanton Story

Honorary AVN Awards

Hall of Fame

AVN Hall of Fame inductees for 1990 were: Lesllie Bovee, Jamie Gillis, Ron Jeremy, Gloria Leonard, Bruce Seven, Joey Silvera. The six were all nominated by the readership of Adult Video News.

Multiple nominations and awards

The following six movies received multiple awards:
 5 - The Nicole Stanton Story I & II
 3 - Night Trips, Voodoo Lust
 2 - Bi and Beyond III, True Love, Undercover

Presenters and performers

Performers

The Moonlight Entertainers provided the music, while comics Bill Hicks, Frank Barnett and Scott Schwartz provided comedy segments and Chi Chi LaRue sang “Wild Thing”.

Ceremony information

Actor Rick Savage hosted the show. He had three co-hosts for different portions of the awards show: Christy Canyon, Barbara Dare and Nina Hartley.

New categories added this year included: Best Amateur Tape and Best Tease Performance.

The Nicole Stanton Story was named top renting release of the year and also top selling release of the year.

See also

 AVN Award for Best Actress
 AVN Award for Best Supporting Actress
 AVN Award for Male Performer of the Year
 AVN Award for Male Foreign Performer of the Year
 AVN Award for Female Foreign Performer of the Year
 AVN Female Performer of the Year Award
 List of members of the AVN Hall of Fame

Notes

 Night Trips, a film, was edited on video.

References

External links
 
 Adult Video News Awards  at the Internet Movie Database

AVN Awards
1989 film awards
AVN Awards 7